Heartsongs: Live from Home is a live album by Dolly Parton, released on September 27, 1994. Recorded at a concert at Parton's theme park Dollywood, the album featured a mix of Parton originals and traditional folk songs. "To Daddy" was one of Parton's compositions that she had never previously released; Emmylou Harris, who recorded the song in 1978, took her recording of the song to the U.S. country singles top three). The campy "PMS Blues" went on to become a concert favorite, and received a fair amount of airplay as an album track. Mairéad Ní Mhaonaigh sang Irish vocals on "Barbara Allen".

“Heartsongs: Live From Home” spoke of Dolly’s desire to share her roots with her fans and celebrates the rich musical heritage of the Smoky Mountains. In an interview right before she recorded the album Dolly said,

“It’s about my life and my roots and my growing up days… It’s about the connection between the Scottish music, the Irish music, the English music, and the Welsh music that has been brought over to the Smoky Mountains that I grew up singing.”

The original song “To Daddy” was a first-time recording for Dolly but had been released in an earlier version by Emmylou Harris.

Track listing

Personnel

Altan - vocals
Mairead Nimahonaigh - vocals, fiddle
Frankie Kennedy - flute
Ciaran Curran - bouzouki
Daithi Gproule - guitar
Ciaran Tourish - fiddle
Dermot Bryne - accordion
Jerry O'Sullivan - uilleann pipes
Timothy White - photography
Alison Krauss - harmony vocals, fiddle
Suzanne Cox - harmony vocals
Rhonda Vincent - harmony vocals
Darrin Vincent - harmony vocals
Carl Jackson - harmony vocals, guitar
Randy Scruggs - guitar
Harry Stinson - drums
Roy Huskey Jr. - upright bass
Jimmy Matthingly - fiddle
David Lindley - Bronson acoustic steel, Hawaiian acoustic steel, dulcimer, autoharp, claw hammer banjo
Adam Steffey - mandolin
Ron Block - banjo
Ronnie McCoury - mandolin
Robbie Mercury - banjo
Pig Robbing - piano
Jerry Douglas - dobro
Bruce Watkins - guitar
Steve Buckingham - guitar
Viktor Krauss - upright bass
Richard Dennison - background vocals
Jennifer O'Brien-Enoch - background vocals
Lisa Silver - background vocals
Louis Nunley - background vocals

Chart performance

References

External links
Heartsongs: Live from Home at dollyon-line.com

1994 live albums
Dolly Parton live albums
albums produced by Steve Buckingham (record producer)
Columbia Records live albums